Francis Rombouts (22 June 1631 – 1691) was the 12th Mayor of New York City, (formerly New Amsterdam), from 1679 to 1680. He was one of three proprietors of the Rombout Patent, and father of pioneering Colonial businesswoman Catheryna Rombout Brett.

Biography
Frans Rombout was born on June 22 at 1631 in Hasselt, Belgium, the second son of Jan and Johanna Haenen Rombout. His father was a tax receiver for the Archdeacon of Liege.

Francis Rombout emigrated to New Amsterdam in 1653 aboard the ship Nieuw Amsterdam. He engaged in trade as a merchant while yet a youth. In the year 1658, he enrolled himself among the burghers, though he had been for several years previously a trader there. His trading operations as a merchant were tolerably extensive, though he did not rank among the wealthiest of the inhabitants. He was probably worth, as near as can be estimated, about ten thousand dollars, which was then, however, considered an independent fortune.  

In 1671, Rombout bought his first house at Nieuw-Amsterdam from Captain Paulus Leenderzen Vandiegrist. A fine stone house with a garden and orchard, it was the next house north of the church-yard, and about midway between Morris and Rector streets, on
the west side of the Heerestraat. The property extended in the back to the North River shore. 

Rombout held several offices of trust among his fellow-citizens. In 1673, 1674, 1676, 1678, 1686, he was an Alderman. Afterward, in 1687, the city having been divided into wards, he was returned as Alderman of the West Ward. He afterward held the office of Justice of the Peace, until his death. His political principles were of a liberal character, and his manners and address grave and dignified. At the time of his mayoralty, the city contained about 3,500 inhabitants. Rombouts Avenue in the Bronx is named for him.

Personal life
On May 31, 1665, Rombout married Aeltie Wessels in the Reformed Dutch Church of New Amsterdam. She died sometime prior to August 5, 1675, when he then married Anna Elizabeth Masschop. Widowed a second time, he married, on September 8, 1683, Helena Teller Bogardus Van Bael. It was the third marriage for both of them. Helena Teller was born about 1645, the daughter of William and Margaret Doncheson Teller of Schenectady. Helena had seven children from her previous marriages, and from this marriage, another three were born. She and Rombout had two boys and a girl. The boys died young but the girl, Catheryna, born on 5 September 1687, survived. Catheryna later married British Royal Navy lieutenant Roger Brett.

The Rombout Patent

The Patent included most of what is today's southern Dutchess County, New York.

Rombout had gone into the fur-trading business with merchant Gulian Verplanck. They were joined in 1683 by the patroon of Van Cortlandt Manor in Westchester County, Stephanus Van Cortlandt.  Before a patent could be issued, Verplanck died, and his widow married Jacobus Kip, to whom the patent was issued.

See a period map of the Patent here at the Mount Gulian Historical Site.

See also

 Rombouts, the surname
 Mount Gulian
 Great Nine Partners Patent
 Little Nine Partners Patent
 Dutchess County land patents
 Philipse Patent

References

External links
Will of Francis Rombouts
Frans (Francis) ROMBOUTS (1631-1691)
Schenectady Digital History Archive, Schenectady County Public Library
 Map of the Rombout Patent at the town of East Fishkill website

Mayors of New York City
American people of Dutch descent
American people of Flemish descent
1631 births
1691 deaths
People from Hasselt
People of New Netherland